Joe or Joseph Judge may refer to:

Joe Judge (American football) (born 1981), American football coach
Joe Judge (baseball) (1894–1963), American baseball player
Joe Judge (footballer) (born 1947), Scottish former amateur footballer
Joseph Judge (1929–1996), American journalist

See also
Joseph Judd (1864–1926), Canadian lawyer and politician